Associazione Sportiva Pizzighettone was an Italian association football club, based in Pizzighettone, Lombardy.

History 
The club was founded in 1919 and up to season 1994–95 took part just to regional amateur championships, such as Eccellenza Lombardy. In 1995, the club promoted to Serie D, the top division of amateur football, which also a cross-regional league.

After a long history of amateur leagues for years, in 2003 the team was promoted to Serie C2 for the first time in their history, under their coach Roberto Venturato. 

Having won promotion playoffs in 2005, Pizzighettone were promoted to Serie C1. It was relegated to Serie C2 in 2007 after play-out.

The following year it was relegated to Serie D, but it was readmitted in 2008–09 Lega Pro Seconda Divisione (ex-Serie C2). In this season it was again relegated to Serie D.

After the bankruptcy of U.S. Pergocrema 1932, Pizzighettone moved to Crema and changed to the color and name of Pergocrema's predecessor: U.S. Pergolettese 1932.

Legacy
Since 2013, Real Pizzighettone became the major football team of the town. The club was relegated to Seconda Categoria in 2016.

Colours and badge 
The team's colours are white and light blue.

Players

Players with international caps include:

 Davide Astori (2006–07)
 Krassimir Chomakov (2006–07)
 Sergio Porrini (2004–09)

References

External links
Official site (Wayback machine archive) 
Entry in Soccerway.com

Defunct football clubs in Italy
Football clubs in Lombardy
Association football clubs established in 1919
Association football clubs disestablished in 2012
Serie C clubs
Province of Cremona